The 2002 Coventry City Council election to the Coventry City Council was held on 3 May 2002.  One third of the council was up for election and the Labour party retained overall control of the council.

Election result

Council Composition
The composition of the council before and after the election can be found in the following table:

Ward results

References

2002
2002 English local elections
2000s in Coventry